A dallah is a traditional Arabic coffee pot used for centuries to brew and serve Qahwa (gahwa), an Arabic coffee or Gulf coffee made through a multi-step ritual, and Khaleeji, a spicy, bitter coffee traditionally served during feasts like Eid al-Fitr.

It is commonly used in the coffee tradition of the Arabian peninsula and of the Bedouins.  Old Bedouins used the ritual of coffee preparation, serving and drinking as a sign of hospitality, generosity and wealth. In much of the Middle East, it is still connected to socializing with friends, family and business partners, so it is typically present in the main rites of passage, such as births, marriages and funerals and some business meetings.

Dallah has a distinctive form, featuring a bulbous body that tapers to a "waistline" in the middle and flares out at the top, covered by a spire-shaped lid topped with a tall finial and held by a sinuous handle.  The most distinctive feature is a long spout with a crescent-shaped beak.  This beak may be covered with a metal flap to keep the coffee warmer, but traditionally it is open to view the coffee as it is poured out.

A dallah can be made of brass, steel, silver and even 24K gold for special occasions or use by royalty.

The origins of the dallah are unclear. Among the earliest references to a dallah as a coffee boiler in the modern shape date to the mid-17th century.

The dallah plays such an important role in the identity of Persian Gulf countries that it is featured in public artworks and on monetary coins. It is also depicted in the watermark form as a security feature on several Saudi Arabian monetary banknotes.

Dallah is typically richly ornamented, usually engraved with geometric patterns, stylized plants and flowers, love scenes from Arabic poetry or other decorations, including semi-precious gemstones and ivory. Modern dallah is more typically practical vessels, and even automatic dallah and thermos dallah are available to the modern coffee drinker.

In its most basic form, Gulf or Arabic coffee has simple ingredients and preparation: water, lightly roasted coffee, and ground cardamom are boiled in a dallah for 10 to 20 minutes and served unfiltered in demitasse cups. Other traditional and regional recipes include saffron or other spices.

See also
Cezve (Turkish coffee pot)
Jebena (Ethiopian coffee pot)
Arabic coffee
Saudi cuisine
 List of cooking vessels

References

Cooking vessels
Serving vessels
Arab cuisine
Saudi Arabian cuisine
Coffee preparation
Middle Eastern cuisine